David Schröder (also spelled Schroeder, born 28 April 1985 in Leipzig) is a German slalom canoeist who has competed at the international level since 2000.

He won two medals in the C2 team event at the ICF Canoe Slalom World Championships with a silver in 2009 and a bronze in 2010. He also won 8 medals at the European Championships (4 golds, 1 silver and 3 bronzes).

At the 2012 Summer Olympics he competed in the C2 event. He did not advance to the semifinals after finishing 11th in the qualifying round.

His partner from 2005 to 2013 was Frank Henze. Since 2014 he has been paddling with Nico Bettge.

World Cup individual podiums

References

External links 
 
 

German male canoeists
Living people
1985 births
Canoeists at the 2012 Summer Olympics
Olympic canoeists of Germany
Sportspeople from Leipzig
Medalists at the ICF Canoe Slalom World Championships
21st-century German people